Rudolf Freiherr von Roman (19 November 1893 – 18 February 1970) was a German general (General of the Artillery) who commanded several corps during World War II. He was recipient of the Knight's Cross of the Iron Cross with Oak Leaves.

Awards and decorations
 Iron Cross (1914) 2nd Class (5 September 1914) & 1st Class  (14 August 1916)

 Clasp to the Iron Cross (1939) 2nd Class (18 September 1939) & 1st Class (1 December 1939)
 German Cross in Gold on 19 December 1941 as Generalmajor and Arko 3
 Knight's Cross of the Iron Cross with Oak Leaves
 Knight's Cross on 19 February 1942 as Generalmajor and commander of 35. Infanterie-Division
 313th Oak Leaves on 28 October 1943 as General der Artillerie and commander of XX. Armeekorps

References

Citations

Bibliography

 
 
 

1893 births
1970 deaths
Generals of Artillery (Wehrmacht)
German Army personnel of World War I
Recipients of the clasp to the Iron Cross, 1st class
Recipients of the Gold German Cross
Recipients of the Knight's Cross of the Iron Cross with Oak Leaves
German prisoners of war in World War II held by the United States
Barons of Germany
Military personnel from Bavaria
People from Bayreuth
People from the Kingdom of Bavaria
20th-century Freikorps personnel
German Army generals of World War II